The women's 400 metres hurdles at the 2014 European Athletics Championships took place at the Letzigrund on 13, 14 and 16 August.

Medalists

Records

Schedule

Results

Round 1

First 3 in each heat (Q) and 4 best performers (q) advance to the Semifinals.

Semifinal

Final

References

Qualifying Round Results
Semi-Final Results
Final Results

Hurdles 400 W
400 metres hurdles at the European Athletics Championships
2014 in women's athletics